Cambio de Piel ("Change of Skin") is a song written by Julio Reyes, produced by Sergio George, and performed by American recording artist Marc Anthony. It was released as the second single from his thirteenth studio 3.0 (2013). A music video for the song is currently filmed at Cancún, Mexico. At the Latin Grammy Awards of 2014, the song received two nominations including Song of the Year and Record of the Year.

Charts

Weekly charts

Year-end charts

References

2013 singles
Marc Anthony songs
Spanish-language songs
Song recordings produced by Sergio George
Sony Music Latin singles
2013 songs
Songs written by Julio Reyes Copello
Songs written by Yoel Henriquez